The Isle of Man Premier League (also known as the Canada Life Premier League for sponsorship reasons) is the highest division of the Isle of Man Football League and the highest overall in the Isle of Man football league system. The Premier League, which was introduced for the 2007–08 season, was previously known as the First Division. Each year, the top finishing club is crowned league champion, and the two lowest placed clubs are relegated to Division Two.

In 2018–19 season, St Marys were the division champions and St Georges were the runners-up. St Johns United and Braddan were relegated to Division Two, finishing 12th and 13th place respectively.

History 
The Isle of Man Premier League was introduced for the 2007–08 season.

Structure of the league

Competition 
The league comprises 13 clubs. Over the course of a season, which runs annually from August to the following May, a club plays each of the others in the same division twice (a double round-robin system), once at their home and once at that of their opponents. This makes for a total of 24 games played each season. Clubs gain three points for a win, one for a draw and none for a defeat. Clubs are ranked by total points, then goal difference, and then goals scored. At the end of the season, the first placed club in the league is crowned Premier League champions.

Promotion and relegation 
A system of promotion and relegation exists between the Premier League and Division Two. At the end of each season the two lowest placed clubs in the Premier League are relegated to Division two, and the top two placed clubs from Division Two are promoted to the Premier League.

Current members 

The following 13 clubs are competing in the Premier League during the 2019–20 season.

Results

League champions and runners-up

Relegated teams (from Premier League to Division Two)

Top scorers

See also 
List of association football competitions
Isle of Man Football League
 Football in the Isle of Man

References

External links 
 Results Website

Football competitions in the Isle of Man